In chemistry tellurate is a compound containing an oxyanion of tellurium where tellurium has an oxidation number of +6. In the naming of inorganic compounds it is a suffix that indicates a polyatomic anion with a  central tellurium atom.

Tellurium oxyanions
Historically the name tellurate was only applied to oxyanions of tellurium with oxidation number +6, formally derived from telluric acid , and the name tellurite referred to oxyanions of tellurium with oxidation number +4, formally derived from tellurous acid  and these names are in common use. However tellurate and tellurite are often referred to as tellurate(VI) and tellurate(IV) respectively in line with IUPAC renaming recommendations. 
Other oxyanions include pentaoxotellurate,  ditellurate,  and polymeric anions with 6-coordinate tellurium such as n.

Metatellurates
The metatellurate ion  is analogous to the sulfate ion,  and the selenate ion, . Whereas many sulfates and selenates form isomorphous salts the tetrahedral metatellurate ion is only found in a few compounds such as the tetraethylammonium salt . Many compounds with a stoichiometry that suggests the presence of a metatellurate ion actually contain polymeric anions containing 6-coordinate tellurium(VI), for example sodium tellurate,  which contains octahedral tellurium centers sharing edges.

 →  +  O2 (E0 = −1.042 V)

The E0 or standard reduction potential value is significant as it gives an indication of the strength of the tellurate ion as an oxidizing agent.

Orthotellurates

ion 
The compound  contains  ions which are trigonal bipyramidal. The compound  contains both  and  anions.

Polymeric tellurate ions
The dimeric  made up of two edge sharing {TeO6} octahedra is found in the compound . A similar hydroxy-oxy anion,  is found in sodium potassium ditellurate(VI) hexahydrate,  which contains pairs of edge sharing octahedra.

Aqueous chemistry
In aqueous solution tellurate ions are 6 coordinate.

Structural comparisons with oxyanions of sulfur and selenium
Sulfur(VI) oxyanions have a coordination number of 4 and in addition to the tetrahedral sulfate ion, the pyrosulfate, trisulfate,  and pentasulfate  ions all contain 4-coordinate sulfur and are built from corner-shared {SO4} tetrahedra. Selenate compounds include many examples of four coordinate selenium, principally the tetrahedral  ion and the pyroselenate ion,  which has a similar structure to the pyrosulfate ion.

NMR spectroscopy

The metatellurate anion has a chemical shift around 610 ppm when analyzed using 125Te NMR at 25 °C at a frequency of 94.735 MHz and referenced externally against aqueous 1.0 M telluric acid.

The tellurate suffix in the naming of inorganic compounds
Following the IUPAC Red Book(2005) some examples are:
metatellurate ion,  is tetraoxidotellurate(2–)
orthotellurate ion,  is hexaoxidotellurate(6–) 
 ion is octafluoridotellurate(2–).

References

Oxyanions